Jeremy King is an American historian, Professor of History at Mount Holyoke. He was research fellow at Harvard University, Berlin Prize Fellow, from the American Academy in Berlin, and 2004–2005 Research Fellow of the American Council of Learned Societies.

Life 
He graduated from Yale University with a B.A, and from Columbia University with an MA, M.Phil., Ph.D.

He lived in Prague, Budapest, and Vienna. 
In the summer of 1989, he held an internship at the Hungarian Section of Radio Free Europe, in Munich.

Works

References

External links
"Interview with Jeremy King, Associate Professor of History at Mount Holyoke College". East-Central Europe Past and Present, March 15, 2010.

21st-century American historians
21st-century American male writers
Year of birth missing (living people)
Mount Holyoke College faculty
Harvard University alumni
Columbia University alumni
Living people
Berlin Prize recipients
Yale University alumni
American male non-fiction writers